Events from the year 1936 in the United States.

Incumbents

Federal Government 
 President: Franklin D. Roosevelt (D-New York)
 Vice President: John Nance Garner (D-Texas)
 Chief Justice: Charles Evans Hughes (New York)
 Speaker of the House of Representatives: Joseph W. Byrns, Sr. (D-Tennessee) (until June 4), William B. Bankhead (D-Alabama) (starting June 4)
 Senate Majority Leader: Joseph Taylor Robinson (D-Arkansas)
 Congress: 74th

Events

January–March

 January 4 – Billboard magazine publishes its first music hit parade.
 January 15 – The first American building to be completely covered in glass is completed in Toledo, Ohio, for the Owens-Illinois Glass Company.
 February 17 – The first superhero to wear a skin-tight costume and mask, The Phantom, makes his appearance in U.S. newspapers.
 March – German American Bund formed in Buffalo, New York, in support of Nazi Germany to succeed the Friends of New Germany, with German-born American citizen Fritz Julius Kuhn elected as its first leader.
 March 1 – Construction of Hoover Dam is completed.
 March 5 – The 8th Academy Awards, hosted by Frank Capra, are presented at Biltmore Hotel in Los Angeles, with Frank Lloyd's Mutiny on the Bounty winning the Academy Award for Outstanding Production. The film receives the most nominations with eight, while John Ford's The Informer wins the most awards with four, including Best Director for Ford.
 March 17–18 – Pittsburgh Flood of 1936 ("St. Patrick's Day Flood"): Pittsburgh, Pennsylvania, suffers the worst flooding in its history.
 March 26 – The longest game in the history of the National Hockey League is played. The Montreal Maroons and Detroit Red Wings are scoreless until 16½ minutes into the sixth overtime when Mud Bruneteau ends it at 2:25 am.

April–June

 April 3 – Richard Hauptmann, convicted of the Lindbergh kidnapping and murder in 1932, is executed by electrocution in New Jersey State Prison.
 April 5 – A tornado hits Tupelo, Mississippi, killing 216 and injuring over 700 (the 4th deadliest tornado in U.S. history).
 April 6 – Two tornadoes strike Gainesville, Georgia. The smaller tornado hits north Gainesville, the stronger tornado the west side of town. 203 die and 1,600 are injured in the 5th deadliest tornado in U.S. history.
 May
 Lawrence Warehouse Company, based in San Francisco, California has an initial public stock offering.
 May 12 – The Santa Fe railroad inaugurates the all-Pullman Super Chief passenger train between Chicago and Los Angeles.
 May 25 – Remington Rand strike of 1936–37 begins.
 June
 A major heat wave strikes North America; high temperature records are set and thousands die.
 The first production model PCC streetcar, built by St. Louis Car Company, is placed in service by Pittsburgh Railways.
 June 7 – The Steel Workers Organizing Committee is founded.
 June 10 – Margaret Mitchell's epic historical romance Gone with the Wind is published.
 June 19 – Max Schmeling knocks out Joe Louis in the 12th round of their heavyweight boxing match at Yankee Stadium in New York City.
 June 29 – United States Maritime Commission is formed.

July–September

 July 11 – Triborough Bridge in New York City is opened to traffic.
 July 13–14 – Peak of July 1936 heat wave: The U.S. states of Wisconsin, Michigan, and Indiana all set new state records for high temperature.
 August 3 – African-American athlete Jesse Owens wins the 100-meter dash at the Berlin Olympics.
 August 14 
Rainey Bethea was hanged in Owensboro, Kentucky, in the last public execution in the United States
1936 Summer Olympics: The United States men's national basketball team wins its first ever Olympic basketball tournament in the final game over Canada, 19–8.

October–December
 October 6 – The New York Yankees defeat the New York Giants (baseball), 4 games to 2, to win their 5th World Series Title.
 October 11 – Earl Bascom, rodeo cowboy and artist, designs and builds Mississippi's first permanent rodeo arena at Columbia, Mississippi.
 October 19 – H.R. Ekins, reporter for the New York World-Telegram, wins a race to travel around the world on commercial airline flights, beating Dorothy Kilgallen of the New York Journal and Leo Kieran of The New York Times. The flight takes 18½ days.
 October 29 – The historic Uptown Theater opens in Washington, D.C.
 November 3 – U.S. presidential election, 1936: Democrat Franklin D. Roosevelt is reelected to a second term in a landslide victory over Republican Governor of Kansas Alf Landon.
 November 12 – In California, the San Francisco–Oakland Bay Bridge opens to traffic.
 November 23 – Life magazine begins publication as a weekly news magazine under the management of Henry Luce.
 November 25 – The Abraham Lincoln Brigade sails from New York City on its way to the Spanish Civil War.
 December 3 – Radio station WQXR is officially founded in New York City.
 December 29 – The United Auto Workers begins the Flint Sit-Down Strike in Flint, Michigan.

Undated
 The YMCA Youth and Government program is founded in Albany, New York.
 Society of American Archivists established.

Ongoing
 Lochner era (c. 1897–c. 1937)
 Dust Bowl (1930–1936)
 New Deal (1933–1939)

Births

January

 January 1 – Don Nehlen, American football player and coach
 January 2 – Roger Miller, American singer, songwriter, musician and actor (d. 1992)
 January 5
 Florence King, American novelist, essayist and columnist (d. 2013)
 Daryl Robertson, American baseball player (d. 2018)
 January 6 – Darlene Hard, American professional tennis player
 January 7 – G. Robert Blakey, American lawyer and academic
 January 9
 Anne Rivers Siddons, American author (d. 2019)
 Ralph Terry, American baseball player (d. 2022)
 January 10
 Stephen E. Ambrose, American historian and biographer (d. 2002)
 Al Goldstein, American publisher and pornographer (d. 2013)
 Robert Wilson, American physicist and radioastronomer, recipient of 2018 Nobel Prize in Physics
 January 14 – Clarence Carter, African-American soul musician
 January 23
 Arlene Golonka, American actress
 Jerry Kramer, American football player
 January 27
 Barry Barish, American gravitational physicist, recipient of 2017 Nobel Prize in Physics
 Troy Donahue, American actor and singer (d. 2001)
 Samuel C. C. Ting, American physicist
 January 28 – Alan Alda, American actor
 January 29 – James Jamerson, American bass guitarist (d. 1983)

February

 February 1 – Azie Taylor Morton, 35th Treasurer of the United States (d. 2003)
 February 3
 Jim Marshall, American photographer (d. 2010)
 Elizabeth Peer, American journalist (d. 1984)
 February 4
 David Brenner, American comedian (d. 2014)
 Gary Conway, American actor
 February 6 – J. Howard Marshall III, American businessman
 February 8 – Larry Verne, American singer, songwriter (d. 2013)
 February 11 – Burt Reynolds, American actor, director and producer (d. 2018)
 February 14 – Andrew Prine, American actor
 February 16 – Carl Icahn, American businessman, investor and philanthropist
 February 17 – Jim Brown, African American football player and actor
 February 19 – Sam Myers, American musician, songwriter (d. 2006)
 February 20 – Larry Hovis, American actor (d. 2003)
 February 21 – Barbara Jordan, African-American lawyer, politician and Civil Rights campaigner (d. 1996)
 February 22
 J. Michael Bishop, American immunologist and microbiologist
 Elizabeth MacRae, American actress
 February 27 – Roger Mahony, American cardinal
 February 29 – Alex Rocco, American actor (d. 2015)

March

 March 3 –  Peter G. Davis, American opera and classical music critic (d. 2021)
 March 5 – Dean Stockwell, American actor (d. 2021)
 March 6 – Marion Barry, African-American politician and civil rights activist (d. 2014)
 March 7 – Loren Acton, American astronaut
 March 8 
 Sue Ane Langdon, American actress
 Earl J. Silbert, American attorney (d. 2022)
 March 9
 Mickey Gilley, American country singer and musician
 Marty Ingels, American actor, agent (d. 2015)
 Tom Sestak, American football player (d. 1987)
 March 11 – Antonin Scalia, Associate Justice of the Supreme Court of the U.S. from 1986 to 2016 (d. 2016)
 March 12 – William Foege, American physician, epidemiologist
 March 15 – Howard Greenfield, American songwriter (d. 1986)
 March 16 – Raymond Damadian, Armenian-American MRI practitioner
 March 17
 Patty Maloney, American actress
 Ken Mattingly, American astronaut
 March 24 – Don Covay, American singer, songwriter (d. 2015)
 March 26 – Harry Kalas, American sportscaster (d. 2009)
 March 28 – Bill Gaither, American singer and songwriter
 March 31
 Marge Piercy, American poet, activist
 Walter E. Williams, American economist (d. 2020)

April

 April 3
 Scott LaFaro, American jazz musician (d. 1961)
 Jimmy McGriff, American jazz musician (d. 2008)
 April 9 – Valerie Solanas, American radical feminist, attempted murderer of Andy Warhol (d. 1988)
 April 10
 John Madden, American football player, coach, and sportscaster (d. 2021)
 Bobby Smith, American singer, songwriter (d. 2013)
 April 12 – Charles Napier, American actor (d. 2011)
 April 14
 Bobby Nichols, American professional golfer
 Frank Serpico, American police officer
 April 18
 Tommy Ivo, American actor, drag racer
 Michael M. Thomas, American novelist and investment banker (d. 2021)
 April 19 – Ruby Johnson, American singer (d. 1999)
 April 20 – Pat Roberts, American politician
 April 21
 Bob Cleary, American ice hockey player (d. 2015)
 James Dobson, American child psychologist, conservative evangelical political activist
 April 22 – Glen Campbell, American musician and actor (d. 2017)
 April 23 – Roy Orbison, American singer, songwriter (d. 1988)
 April 24
 Glen Hobbie, American baseball player (d. 2013)
 Jim Rountree, American CFL football player (d. 2013)
 April 26 – Doug Sax, American mastering engineer (d. 2015)
 April 28 – Charles Hill, American diplomat and academic (d. 2021)
 April 29 – Lane Smith, American actor (d. 2005)
 April 30
 Jerry Bellune, editor and publisher
 Bobby Gregg, American musician (d. 2014)

May

 May 1 – Jerry Mander, American author and activist
 May 2
 Sam DeLuca, American football offensive lineman, sports broadcaster (d. 2011)
 Perdita Huston, American journalist (d. 2001)
 May 7 – Jimmy Ruffin, African-American singer (d. 2014) 
 May 8 – Clyde Bellecourt, Native American rights organiser (d. 2022) 
 May 9
 Terry Drinkwater, American television and radio journalist (d. 1989)
 Floyd Robinson, African-American baseball player
 May 12
 Tom Snyder, American talk show host (d. 2007)
 Frank Stella, American minimalist painter
 May 14
 Bobby Darin, American singer and actor (d. 1973)
 Dick Howser, American baseball shortstop, manager (d. 1987)
 May 15 
 Wavy Gravy, American anti-war activist
 Paul Zindel, American writer (d. 2003)
 May 17 – Dennis Hopper, American actor and director (d. 2010)
 May 22 
 George H. Heilmeier, American engineer (d. 2014)
 M. Scott Peck, American psychiatrist (d. 2005)
 May 23 – Charles Kimbrough, American actor
 May 24 – Harold Budd, American avant-garde composer and poet (d. 2020)
 May 25 – Tom T. Hall, American country singer-songwriter (d. 2021)
 May 27 – Louis Gossett Jr., African-American actor
 May 29 – Arlene McQuade, American actress (d. 2014)

June

 June 3 – Larry McMurtry, American novelist, essayist, bookseller and screenwriter (d. 2021)
 June 4 – Bruce Dern, American screen actor
 June 6
 Richard Green, American sexologist, psychiatrist, lawyer and author (d. 2019)
 Levi Stubbs, American baritone singer (d. 2008)
 June 8
 James Darren, American actor, singer
 Kenneth G. Wilson, American theoretical physicist (d. 2013)
 June 11 – Jud Strunk, American singer and comedian (d. 1981)
 June 12 – Marcus Belgrave, American jazz trumpeter (d. 2015)
 June 14 – Renaldo Benson, American R&B singer-songwriter (d. 2005)
 June 15 – William Levada, American cardinal (d. 2019)
 June 19 – Shirley Goodman, American R&B singer (d. 2005)
 June 20 – Billy Guy, American singer (d. 2002)
 June 22 – Kris Kristofferson, American actor and singer-songwriter
 June 24 – Robert Downey Sr., American film actor and director (d. 2021)
 June 26 – Hal Greer, African-American professional basketball player (d. 2018)
 June 27 – Lucille Clifton, American poet, writer and educator (d. 2010)
 June 28
 Chuck Howley, American football player
 Major Owens, African-American politician (d. 2013)
 June 29 – Harmon Killebrew, American baseball player (d. 2011)
 June 30 – Nancy Dussault, American actress and singer

July

 July 1
 Ron Masak, American actor (d. 2022)
 Syl Johnson, African-American blues musician (d. 2022)
 July 4 – Dick Hyde, American trombonist (d. 2019)
 July 5 – Shirley Knight, American actress (d. 2020)
 July 7 – Joseph Renzulli, American educational psychologist
 July 9
 James Hampton, American actor
 June Jordan, Jamaican American poet, essayist, teacher, and activist (d. 2002)
 David Zinman, American conductor and violinist
 July 10
 Herbert Boyer, American biotechnology entrepreneur
 Barbara B. Kennelly, American politician
 July 11 – Joe Bussard, American record collector (d. 2022)
 July 13 – Albert Ayler, African-American saxophonist, singer and composer (d. 1970)
 July 14
 Pema Chödrön, American Tibetan Buddhist
 Robert F. Overmyer, American astronaut (d. 1996)
 July 15
 Larry Cohen, American film director, producer and screenwriter (d. 2019)
 George Voinovich, American politician (d. 2016)
 July 16 – Buddy Merrill, American musician
 July 18 – Jerry Richardson, American businessman and football club owner  (d. 2023)
 July 19 – Connie Kurtz, American LGBT rights activist (d. 2018)
 July 20
 Butch Baird, American professional golfer
 Barbara Mikulski, American politician
 July 23
 Don Drysdale, American baseball player (d. 1993)
 Anthony Kennedy, Associate Justice of the Supreme Court of the U.S. from 1988
 July 24
 Ruth Buzzi, American actress, comedian, and singer
 Mark Goddard, American actor
 July 26 – Kathryn Hays, American actress
 July 27 – J. Robert Hooper, American politician (d. 2008)
 July 29 – Elizabeth Dole, American politician
 July 30 – Buddy Guy, African-American blues singer and guitarist

August

 August 1 – Bradford Bishop, American fugitive
 August 7 – Richard L. Tierney, American poet, novelist
 August 8
 Don Bowden, American middle-distance runner
 Frank Howard, American baseball player
 August 11 – Bill Monbouquette, American baseball player (d. 2015)
 August 12 – John Poindexter, American Naval officer, US Chief of Staff
 August 16 – Anita Gillette, American actress
 August 17
 Margaret Hamilton, American computer scientist, systems engineer, and business owner
 Floyd Westerman, Native-American cctor, artist, musician, and political activist
 August 18 – Robert Redford, American actor, film director, producer, businessman, environmentalist, philanthropist
 August 20 – Sam Melville, American actor (d. 1989)
 August 21 – Wilt Chamberlain, African-American basketball player (d. 1999)
 August 22
 Dale Hawkins, American singer-songwriter (d. 2010)
 Lex Humphries, American drummer (d. 1994)
 August 23
 Rudy Lewis, American R&B singer (d. 1964)
 Henry Lee Lucas, American serial killer (d. 2001)
 August 24
 William J. Coyne, American politician (d. 2013)
 Kenny Guinn, American politician (d. 2010)
 August 26 – Benedict Anderson, American academic (d. 2015)
 August 27 – Joel Kovel, American scholar and author (d. 2018)
 August 28 – Don Denkinger, American professional baseball player
 August 29 – John McCain, American politician, U.S. Senator (R-Az.)  (d. 2018)
 August 31 –  Richard J. Ferris, American business executive (d. 2022)

September

 September 3 – John Olver, politician
 September 5
 John Danforth, politician
 Alcee Hastings, African-American politician (d. 2021)
 Jonathan Kozol, writer, educator, and activist
 Bill Mazeroski, professional baseball player
 September 7 – Buddy Holly, singer-songwriter and a pioneer of rock and roll (d. 1959)
 September 11 – Charles Dierkop, actor
 September 14
 Walter Koenig, actor
 Ferid Murad, Albanian-American physician and pharmacologist
 Stan Williams, professional baseball player (died 2021)
 September 19 – Al Oerter, Olympic athlete (died 2007)
 September 21 – Dickey Lee, singer and songwriter
 September 22 – Art Metrano, actor and comedian (died 2021)
 September 24 – Jim Henson, puppeteer, filmmaker, and television producer  (The Muppets) (died 1990)
 September 25 – Ken Forsse, inventor, producer and creator of Teddy Ruxpin (d. 2014)
 September 27 – Don Cornelius, African-American television personality and host of Soul Train (died 2012)
 September 30 – Jim Sasser, politician

October

 October 1 – Edward Villella, American danseur and choreographer
 October 3 – Steve Reich, American composer
 October 7 – Frank Otto, American educator (d. 2017)
 October 8 – Joe M. Haynes, American politician (d. 2018)
 October 11
 C. Gordon Fullerton, American astronaut (d. 2013)
 Larry Staverman, American professional basketball player, coach (d. 2007)
 October 13 – Cliff Gorman, American actor (d. 2002)
 October 14 – Carrie Nye, American actress (d. 2006)
 October 17 – Dave Hobson, American politician
 October 19
 James Bevel, African-American civil rights activist (d. 2008)

 Tony Lo Bianco, American actor
 James P. Liautaud, American industrialist, inventor and business theorist (d. 2015)
 October 20 – Joanna Simon, American mezzo-soprano and journalist (d. 2022)
 October 22 – Bobby Seale, African-American political activist
 October 24 – David Nelson, American actor, director, and producer (d. 2011)
 October 26 – Shelley Morrison, American actress (d. 2019)
 October 28 – Charlie Daniels, American country musician and singer-songwriter
 October 30 – Merri Dee, American television journalist and philanthropist (d. 2022)
 October 31 – Michael Landon, American actor, director, producer and writer (d. 1991)

November

 November 2 – Rose Bird, American judge (d. 1999)
 November 3 – Clifford Curry, American singer (d. 2016)
 November 4 – C. K. Williams, American poet (d. 2015)
 November 5 – Billy Sherrill, American record producer, arranger and songwriter (d. 2015)
 November 9
 Bob Graham, American politician
 Teddy Infuhr, American child actor (d. 2007)
 November 11 – Susan Kohner, American actress
 November 14
 Cornell Gunter, American singer (The Coasters and The Flairs) (d. 1990)
 Bob Walkup, American politician, Mayor of Tucson (d. 2021)
 November 19 – Dick Cavett, American talk show host, television personality
 November 20 – Don DeLillo, American author
 November 23 
 Frank Caprio, American judge
 Steve Landesberg, American actor, director (d. 2010)
 November 27 – Glynn Lunney, American aerospace engineer (d. 2021)
 November 28 – Gary Hart, American politician, diplomat, and lawyer

December

 December 4 – Larry Davis, African-American blues musician (d. 1994)
 December 5 – James Lee Burke, American author
 December 6
 Kenneth Copeland, American televangelist
 David Ossman, American writer and comedian
 December 7 – Martha Layne Collins, American businesswoman and politician
 December 8 – David Carradine, American actor, director and martial artist (d. 2009)
 December 11 – Tom Fuccello, American actor (d. 1993)
 December 12 – Reggie Young, American musician (d. 2019)
 December 13 – J. C. Martin, American professional baseball player
 December 14 – Robert A. Parker, American physicist and astronomer
 December 15 – Donald Goines, American novelist (d. 1974)
 December 17 – Rollie Sheldon, American professional baseball player
 December 20 – Judy Henske, American singer-songwriter (d. 2022)
 December 21 – Barbara Roberts, American politician
 December 22
 Héctor Elizondo, American actor
 Fred Malek, American business executive, political advisor and philanthropist (d. 2019)
 December 23
 Frederic Forrest, American actor
 Bobby Ross, American football player and coach
 James Stacy, American actor (d. 2016)
 December 24 – Dirck Halstead, American photojournalist (d. 2022)
 December 28 – Lawrence Schiller, American journalist, film producer, director and screenwriter
 December 29
 Mary Tyler Moore, American actress, producer and diabetes awareness activist (d. 2017)
 Ray Nitschke, American professional football player (d. 1998)

Deaths
 January 1 – Harry B. Smith, songwriter, librettist and composer (born 1860)
 January 6 – Louise Bryant, journalist (born 1885)
 January 9 – John Gilbert, silent film actor (born 1897)
 January 15 – George Landenberger, U.S. Navy Captain and 23rd Governor of American Samoa (born 1879)
 January 16 – Albert Fish, serial killer (executed; born 1870)
 February 3 – Elia Goode Byington, newspaper proprietor, editor, and manager (born 1858)
 February 8 – Charles Curtis, 31st Vice President of the United States from 1929 to 1933 (born 1860)
 February 9 – John Cutting Berry, physician and missionary (born 1847)
 February 19 – Billy Mitchell, U.S. general and military aviation pioneer (born 1879)
 March 4 – Charles F. Watkins, physician (born 1872)
 March 6 – Rubin Goldmark, pianist, composer and teacher (born 1872)
 March 11 – Ferdinand Lee Barnett, African American journalist, lawyer and civil rights activist (born 1852)
 March 18 – W. Herbert Dunton, Western painter (born 1878)
 April 3 – Richard Hauptmann, carpenter convicted of murder (born 1899 in Germany; executed)
 April 13 – Howard Thurston, stage magician (born 1869)
 April 22 – Mary Haviland Stilwell Kuesel, pioneer dentist (born 1866)
 May 20 – Elmer Fowler Stone, first United States Coast Guard aviator (born 1887)
 May 29 – Norman Chaney, actor (born 1914)
 June 11 – Robert E. Howard, pulp fiction and fantasy writer and poet (suicide; born 1906)
 June 27 – Mike Bernard, ragtime musician (born 1881)
 July 8 – Thomas Meighan, actor (b. 1879)
 July 21 – Earle Ovington, aviator, flew first experimental airmail (born 1879)
 August 8 – Mourning Dove, Native American writer (born 1884)
 September 14 – Irving Thalberg, film producer, pneumonia, (born 1899)
 September 26 – Harriet Monroe, literary editor, scholar and critic and patron of the arts (born 1860)
 October 3 – John Heisman, American football coach (born 1869)
 October 8 
 Cheiro, astrologer (born 1866 in Ireland)
 William Henry Stark, businessman (born 1851)
 October 13 – John H. Hill, African American lawyer and educator (born 1852)
 October 20 – Anne Sullivan, teacher of Helen Keller (born 1866)
 November 2 – Nathaniel P. Conrey, politician and Associate Justice of the Supreme Court of California (born 1860)
 November 6 – Henry Bourne Joy, business leader (born 1864)
 November 22 – Oris Paxton Van Sweringen, financier (born 1879)
December 8 – Katherine Metzel Debs, wife of American Socialist Eugene V. Debs (born 1867)
 December 11 – Myron Grimshaw, baseball player (born 1875)
 December 24 – Irene Fenwick, stage and silent film actress (anorexia; born 1887)

See also
 List of American films of 1936
 Timeline of United States history (1930–1949)

References

External links
 

 
1930s in the United States
United States
United States
Years of the 20th century in the United States